Jacob "Yasha" Katzenberg (born  1888) was an organized crime figure in New York who supplied narcotics to mobsters including Charles "Lucky" Luciano, Waxey Gordon, Charles "King" Solomon, Harry "Nig" Rosen, the Torrio–Capone organization as well as mobsters in Detroit, Kansas City and St. Louis.

Biography
Born in Russia, Katzenberg grew up in Manhattan's Lower East Side and, by the mid-1920s, he had become involved with Arnold Rothstein in drug trafficking helping purchasing heroin from Europe and establishing pipelines into New York for distribution throughout the rest of the country. Following Rothstein's death in 1928, Katzenberg was readily enlisted by Luciano and Louis "Lepke" Buchalter to obtain heroin for their own operations as well as bootleg liquor. 

During the early 1930s, following regulations by the League of Nations for countries to reduce drug production to meet domestic medical needs, the availability of narcotics began to decline and traveled to Asia following the end of Prohibition in 1933. Returning to Brooklyn, Katzenberg established an opium processing plant on Seymour Avenue (reportedly backed by Buchalter and Meyer Lansky among others rumored to be partners in the operation) along with several others. 

In December 1935, authorities discovered the plant following an explosion which destroyed much of the manufacturing equipment. However, agents with the Federal Narcotics Bureau were unable to obtain enough evidence to press charges against Katzenberg and his partners. Meeting with Buchalter and Lansky, the three agreed that he and Buchalter would continue smuggling narcotics from Hong Kong and Shanghai into the United States through connections with officials within the United States Customs. It was later claimed by customs officials that $10 million was made from only six purchases made by Katzenberg between December 1935 and February 1937. 

Informants eventually infiltrated the drug ring and many of its members including Katzenberg were indicted by federal authorities. Fleeing the country, Katzenberg traveled to Romania and, although detained by officials, he was instead deported to neighboring Greece where he was held in custody until his extradition to the United States. Eventually convicted on narcotics charges, Katzenberg was issued a fine of $10,000 sentenced ten years imprisonment. He would later testify against Buchalter and Johnny Torrio and, following his release, disappeared from public record.

Further reading
McCoy, Alfred W. The Politics of Heroin: CIA Complicity in the Global Drug Trade. Brooklyn: Lawrence Hill Books, 1991. 
Messick, Hank. Lansky. London: Robert Hale & Company, 1973. 
Messick, Hank. Of Grass and Snow: The Secret Criminal Elite. Englewood Cliffs NJ: Prentice-Hall, 1979.

External links
Yasha, "The Wandering Jew" by Allan May
"Crime: Opium and Morphine". Time, December 12, 1938.

1880s births
Jewish American gangsters
American people of Russian-Jewish descent
Year of death unknown
Emigrants from the Russian Empire to the United States